Xenocypris fangi is a species of cyprinid in China, of the genus Xenocypris. It inhabits the upper Yangtze and is considered harmless to humans.

References

Cyprinid fish of Asia
Fish described in 1930
Freshwater fish of China